Chocolate Bayou is an unincorporated community in eastern Brazoria County, Texas, United States. According to the Handbook of Texas, the community had a population of 60 in 2000. It is located within the Greater Houston metropolitan area.

History
Chocolate Bayou is located near the bayou of the same name. This area was originally part of a land grant to Stephen F. Austin and James Franklin Perry. Perry's sister, Emily Austin Perry, operated the Peach Point Plantation. It produced cotton and sugar. By 1911, Chocolate Bayou gained its first post office, and three years later, the St. Louis, Brownsville and Mexico Railway established service through the area. During that time, it had 25 residents, a general store, and two hay shippers. The discovery of oil occurred in 1946. The post office closed in 1950 and the population dropped to 50. Its only business closed in 1966. In 1920, the community counted 150 residents, its highest population total through 1990 and 2000 when it counted 60 people.

Geography
Chocolate Bayou is located on Farm to Market Road 2917 between Texas State Highway 35 and FM 2403 in eastern Brazoria County.

Education
The Alvin Independent School District operates schools in the area. Children attend R.L. Stevenson Primary School, Walt Disney Elementary School, Alvin Junior High School, and Alvin High School.

Notable person
 James Elijah Brown Perry (born May 17, 1830, in Potosi, Missouri; died February 14, 1831, in Chocolate Bayou)

References

External links

Unincorporated communities in Brazoria County, Texas
Unincorporated communities in Texas